Harry Dewse (23 February 1836 – 8 July 1910) was an English first-class cricketer, who played one match for Yorkshire County Cricket Club, against Middlesex at the Prince's Cricket Ground, Chelsea in May 1873.

He took a catch and conceded 15 runs in four underarm overs (of four balls each) without taking a wicket. In his two innings he scored 2 and 12.  An occasional wicket-keeper, he did not keep wicket in this game.  Middlesex won the game by 10 wickets. 
Born in York, England, Dewse died in July 1910 in the same city.

References

External links
Cricinfo Profile

1836 births
1910 deaths
Yorkshire cricketers
Cricketers from York
English cricketers
English cricketers of 1864 to 1889